The Brilliance BS2 or FRV and FSV is a car produced by the Brilliance Auto in the People's Republic of China.

Overview
It was originally announced at the Frankfurt Motor Show in 2007 as a pre-production car and then at the Beijing Auto Show in 2008, and was given its European premiere at the 2009 Geneva Motor Show. Prior to its public launch, it was named Brilliance A1.

It was designed by Italdesign Giugiaro and developed in China as a 5-door small family hatchback to complement the larger Brilliance BS4 and BS6. A 4-door saloon version was also developed and is sold as the Brilliance FSV.

The FRV Cross is a crossover style variant with different trim but sharing the same mechanicals as the FRV and FSV.

The BS2 is not widely exported, and despite its display at Frankfurt and Geneva, the car was never launched in Europe due to the bad press received by the crash test results of the larger BS6 and Brilliance withdrew from European markets. 

The BS2 received a facelift in 2010 with alterations to the front bumper and grille.

Specifications
The BS2 was originally powered by a Mitsubishi 1.6 L 4-cylinder 16-valve petrol engine (Euro III), producing . This engine was later replaced with a Euro IV rated 1.5 L engine of Brilliance's own design.

Gallery

References

External links
Brilliance FRV website

BS2
Cars of China
Compact cars
Italdesign vehicles
2010s cars
Cars introduced in 2008